Emily Martin (born 4 March 2001) is a British diver in the springboard 10 metre platform event.

Career 
Emily Martin made her national team debut at the 2016 FINA Grand Prix at the age of 16. In June 2022, Vallée was named to England's 2022 Commonwealth Games team. She won a bronze medal in the 10 m platform event.

References 

2001 births
Living people
English female divers
Divers at the 2022 Commonwealth Games
Commonwealth Games medallists in diving
Commonwealth Games bronze medallists for England
Sportspeople from Southampton
Medallists at the 2022 Commonwealth Games